Helen Margaret Gifford OAM (born 5 September 1935) is an Australian composer. On Australia Day (26 January) 1996 she was appointed to the Medal of the Order of Australia, "in recognition of service to music as a composer". At the APRA Music Awards of 2016 she won the category "Distinguished Services to Australian Music".

Biography 
Helen Gifford was born in Melbourne, Australia, of Scots and Cornish heritage. Gifford attended Tintern Junior School and Melbourne Girls Grammar, and then the University of Melbourne Conservatorium on a Commonwealth Scholarship. She studied with Roy Shepherd and Dorian Le Gallienne, graduating with a Bachelor of Music in 1958. She won the Dorian Le Gallienne Award in 1965, a Senior Composer's Fellowship in 1973, and served as composer-in-residence with the Australian Opera beginning in 1974. In the 1960s and early '70s, her music showed the influence of travel to India and Indonesia. At the Australia Day Honours in 1996 she was appointed to the Medal of the Order of Australia, with a citation, "In recognition of service to music as a composer." At the APRA Music Awards of 2016 she won the Art Music Award category, Distinguished Services to Australian Music.

Helen Gifford is a represented artist of the Australian Music Centre.

Compositions 
Gifford was commissioned by the ELISION Ensemble to compose Music for the Adonia in 1993. It was written for soprano Deborah Kayser, with the ELISION Ensemble to accompany her on piccolo/flute, clarinet, percussion, harp, mandolin, 10-string guitar, viola and cello. It was inspired by the annual women's festival, Adonia, held in Athens in ancient Greek times.

She composed As Foretold to Khayyam, for pianist Michael Kieran Harvey in 1999 on commission from ABC Classic FM. The same year she wrote a 50-minute work for choir and instruments, Choral Scenes: The Western Front, World War I. Commissioned by Astra, it was a setting of English, French and German verse of that time. She also wrote the work Catharsis (2002) for the Astra choir. It includes verse by Anna Akhmatova, Kathleen Raine and Elizabeth Riddell. In Spell Against Sorrow (2003), for soprano and guitar, written for Deborah Kayser and Geoffrey Morris, Gifford used text from three poems of Kathleen Raine. Menin Gate (2005) was written for Michael Kieran Harvey and won APRA/AMC Classical Music State Award for Victoria 2006.

In 2014, Gifford composed Desperation for violist Phoebe Green. This work was premiered at a concert presented by Astra - Helen Gifford at 80.

In 2015, Gifford composed Undertones of War inspired by Edmund Blunden's book Undertones of War. The work was premiered by pianist Michael Kieran Harvey and commissioned by Melbourne Composers' League.

Works
Gifford composes for stage, orchestra, chamber ensemble and solo instruments, often incorporating elements of Balinese and Javanese music. Selected works include:

Carol: As dew in Aprille (1955) for voice and piano
Fantasy (1958) for flute and piano
Piano sonata (1960) for solo piano
Skiagram (1963) for flute, viola and vibraphone
Phantasma (1963) for string orchestra
Red autumn in Valvins (1964) for soprano or mezzo-soprano and piano (text: Christopher Brennan)
Chimaera (1967) for orchestra
Fable (1967) for harp
Imperium (1969) for orchestra
Sonnet (1969) for guitar, flute and harpsichord
Of old Angkor (1970) for French horn and marimba
Regarding Faustus (1983)
Iphigenia in Exile (1985)
Music for the Adonia (1993) for chamber ensemble
Plaint for lost worlds (1994) for flute, clarinet and piano
Point of Ignition (1995) for mezzo-soprano and orchestra (text: Jessica Aldridge)
Choral Scenes: the Western Front, World War I (1999)
As foretold to Khayyám (1999) for piano solo
Catharsis (2001) SATB choir with soloists and speaker
Menin Gate (2005) for piano solo
The Tears of Things (2010) for speaker and choir
Shiva the auspicious one (2012) for piano solo
Parvati and Celebrations of the Apsaras (2013) for clarinet solo
Desperation (2015) for viola solo
Undertones of War (2015) for piano solo
Ancestress (2018) for viola and piano

References

1935 births
Living people
20th-century classical composers
21st-century classical composers
APRA Award winners
Australian classical composers
Australian women classical composers
Australian music educators
Musicians from Melbourne
People educated at Melbourne Girls Grammar
University of Melbourne alumni
University of Melbourne women
Women music educators
20th-century women composers
21st-century women composers
Recipients of the Medal of the Order of Australia